Yaanai Mel Kuthirai Sawaari is a 2016 Indian Tamil-language comedy drama film written, produced, and directed by Karupaiyaa Murugan. The film Archana Singh, Rajendran, Swaminathan, Krishnamoorthy, Muthuraman, Mippu, and Tharika. The songs of the movie were composed by Imalayen, while Taj Noor composed the score. Cinematography was handled by S. Mohan and editing by C. Ganesh Kumar. The film released on 19 August 2016.

Plot 
Akalya (Archana Singh) works in a loom factory and works under her boss (Muthuraman), who is in love with her. Two men (Rajendran and Swaminathan) manage a loom factory next door to Akalya's, and they fall in love with her. Hari (Krishnamoorthy), an ice cream seller, forgets his age and wants to marry Akalya. Meanwhile, Sunil Kumar falls in love a tenth standard girl, Nirmala. With several people in love with her, Akalya is unsure of what to do. The wives of the men who are in love with Akalya come to Akalya's house. They tell Akalya that if she tells the police about all of her loves, then all the wives will suffer. To prevent any issues, the wives suffocate Akalya and hang her from the ceiling as if she committed suicide.

Cast 

Archana Singh as Akalya
Motta Rajendran 
Swaminathan
Krishnamoorthy as M. Hari
Muthuraman as Akalya's boss
Mippu as Sunil Kumar
Tharika as Nirmala
Sumathi as Swaminathan's wife

Soundtrack 
The songs are composed by Imalayen and Taj Noor.

Release 
The New Indian Express wrote that "Yaanai Mel... is at the most a stepping stone for a debutant director". The Times of India Samayam gave the film a rating of one out of five stars and praised the film's title and music while criticizing the double meaning comic sequences. Dinamalar praised the director and actors' performances while criticizing the editing, cinematography, and climax.

References

External links 
 Yaanai Mel Kuthirai Sawaari at The Times of India

2016 comedy films
Indian comedy-drama films
2016 comedy-drama films